Andrew McCall (15 March 1925 – December 2014) was a Scottish professional footballer who played as a winger, making over 300 appearances in the Football League.

Early and personal life
Born in Hamilton, Lanarkshire, McCall joined the Royal Navy at the age of seventeen. He later served with the King's Own Scottish Borderers before starting his football career at Junior level with Bent Royal Oak PSA and Blantyre Celtic.

His son, Stuart, is a former international footballer who later became a manager. McCall suffered burns to around 25% of his body in the 1985 Bradford City stadium fire. He was watching his son play.

Career
McCall moved to England to sign with Blackpool in 1947, making 87 league appearances over the next four years. On a low wage, he supplemented his income by working at Blackpool Pleasure Beach during the summers. In 2021, exactly seventy years after McCall left Blackpool, his son, Stuart, joined the club as assistant to head coach Neil Critchley.

McCall signed for West Bromwich Albion in 1951, and in his sole season at the club made 31 league appearances. He then signed for Leeds United in 1952, and in three years made 62 league appearances. He later played with Welsh side Lovell's Athletic, before returning to English football with Halifax Town, for whom he made 139 league appearances.

References

1925 births
2014 deaths
Scottish footballers
Blantyre Celtic F.C. players
Blackpool F.C. players
West Bromwich Albion F.C. players
Leeds United F.C. players
Halifax Town A.F.C. players
Lovell's Athletic F.C. players
English Football League players
Association football wingers
Scottish Junior Football Association players
Footballers from Hamilton, South Lanarkshire
Royal Navy personnel of World War II
British Army personnel of World War II
Scottish military personnel
King's Own Scottish Borderers soldiers
20th-century British Army personnel